Radziszewski is a Polish surname. Notable people with the surname include:

Piotr Radziszewski (born 1970), Polish urologist
Ray Radziszewski (born 1935), American basketball player

Polish-language surnames